Philip Michael To (born 20 December 1990) is a Hong Kong footballer who plays as a defender for Hong Kong Second Division club Tung Sing.

References

External links
 
 Philip To at HKFA

1990 births
Living people
Hong Kong footballers
Association football defenders
Southern District FC players
Happy Valley AA players
Yuen Long FC players
Hong Kong Rangers FC players
Hoi King SA players
Tai Po FC players
Hong Kong First Division League players
Hong Kong Premier League players